Cangbeicun is a metro station on Line 8 of the Hangzhou Metro in China. It was opened on 28 June 2021, together with the Line 8. It is located in the Qiantang District of Hangzhou, near the Cangbei Village.

Gallery

References 

Hangzhou Metro stations
Railway stations in China opened in 2021